St. Catharines/Niagara District Airport  is a regional airport located in Niagara-on-the-Lake, Ontario, Canada. It is classified as an airport of entry by NAV CANADA and is staffed by the Canada Border Services Agency on a call out basis from the Queenston-Lewiston Bridge. CBSA officers at this airport currently can handle general aviation aircraft only, with no more than 15 passengers.

History

Pre-World War II
 March 1929 - The St. Catharines Flying Club (S.C.F.C.) completed the requirements necessary to qualify for government assistance.
 June 1929 - The S.C.F.C. received its first aircraft and became operational.
 September 13–15, 1929 - Official opening of the S.C.F.C.

In 1929, the facilities were described by the S.C.F.C. in one of their publications as follows:

World War II - No. 9 Elementary Flying Training School (E.F.T.S.)

Murton A. Seymour, president of the St. Catharines Flying Club (S.C.F.C.) was instrumental in forming the Canadian Flying Clubs Association. He travelled to Ottawa in 1939 to meet the Minister of National Defence, Ian Alistair Mackenzie, in an attempt to have the government support air training through existing flying clubs.

With the outbreak of World War II many flying clubs, including the S.C.F.C, saw their resources being stretched to the limit. This was due to new members hoping to gain qualifications in an attempt to automatically qualify for the Royal Canadian Air Force.

Seymour advocated for the placement of an Elementary Flying Training School (E.F.T.S.) at St. Catharines as part of the British Commonwealth Air Training Plan. This goal was realized on 12 August 1940 when the Royal Canadian Air Force Headquarters announced the creation of No. 9 E.F.T.S. to be located at St. Catharines. The school was set to open on 15 March 1941 with an initial intake of 24 students. Shortly thereafter, an order was received from Ottawa announcing that the new opening date was to be 15 October 1940 and that the school was expected to accept 28 students.  The manager of the Flying School was Fred Samuel Pattison (previously partner of Haney's Garage)

One of the challenges faced by the S.C.F.C. was soft field conditions. To counter this, construction of new runways began in May 1941, which helped to ensure the permanency of the St. Catharines airport.

No. 9 E.F.T.S. was formally disbanded on 14 January 1944. When the school closed it had accepted 2,468 student pilots. Of these, 1,848 graduated from the program. The total air time for the school was 134,011 hours.

After No. 9 E.F.T.S. was disbanded the airport became home to RCAF No. 4 Wireless School Flying Squadron. This unit was located at the airport until 15 August 1945.

Airport facilities

The airport primarily serves general aviation (GA) aircraft, but it is not unusual to see chartered aircraft (turboprops and business jets) delivering passengers to waiting limousines for a ride to the Niagara Fallsview Casino Resort or other local attractions. In the past, the airport has also hosted delivery aircraft bringing rush order parts for the nearby General Motors plants.

The airport is home base for the Civil Air Rescue Emergency Service (CARES) Niagara, Unit #11 of Ontario Civil Air Search and Rescue Association (CASARA). CARES Niagara is a charitable organization which promotes aviation safety and provides civilian voluntary search and rescue (SAR) service in a support role to the Canadian military.

It is also not unusual to see Royal Canadian Air Force search and rescue aircraft on the ramp refueling while on search and rescue or training missions in the region.

The Southern Ontario Gliding Centre (SOGC) of the Royal Canadian Air Cadets utilize the airport for spring and fall familiarization flights for the cadets.

Airlines and destinations

Famous flyers
 Leonard Birchall - member of the St. Catharines Flying Club in 1932
 John Gillespie Magee, Jr. - trained with No. 9 E.F.T.S. January–March 1941
 Charles Woods - trained with No. 9 E.F.T.S. July–August 1941

Operators
 Allied Aviation
 Civil Air Rescue Emergency Service (CASARA Ontario Unit 11)
 Esso (Imperial Oil)
 FlyGTA Airways
 National Helicopters Inc. (tour and charter service, aerial photography, frost control and agricultural services)
 St. Catharines Flying Club (flight training and Canada's oldest flying club)
 Fox Aviation (charter and tours)

See also
 Niagara Falls/Niagara South Airport
 Niagara Central Airport

References

St. Catharines/Niagara District Airport

External links

Page about this airport on COPA's Places to Fly airport directory

Certified airports in Ontario
Transport in the Regional Municipality of Niagara
Royal Canadian Air Force stations
Military airbases in Ontario
Airports of the British Commonwealth Air Training Plan
Military history of Ontario